Chazishan station is a subway station in Changsha, Hunan, China, operated by the Changsha subway operator Changsha Metro.

Station layout
The station has one island platform.

History
Construction began on July 13, 2015. The station opened on 26 May 2019.

It has been drafted as Financial Center station.

Surrounding area
 Tanshan Park
 Chashan Park
 Hunan Financial Center

References

Railway stations in Hunan
Railway stations in China opened in 2019